Saughtree railway station is a closed railway station situated a mile north of the hamlet of Saughtree and two miles from the border with England.

History

Saughtree railway station was on the Border Counties Railway which linked the Newcastle and Carlisle Railway, near Hexham, with the Border Union Railway at Riccarton Junction. The first section of the route was opened between Hexham and Chollerford in 1858, the remainder opening in 1862. The service was suspended altogether on 1 December 1944 as a wartime economy measure, eventually being reinstated in August 1948.

The line was closed to passengers by British Railways in October 1956 and completely two years later. The station had a single platform, a stone-built station building, and a siding.

The station building and platform have been restored and 400 yards of new track laid.

References

External links
Saughtree Station on Disused Stations
Saughtree Station on Northumbrian Railways
Saughtree Station on a navigable 1945 O. S. map

Disused railway stations in the Scottish Borders
Former North British Railway stations
Railway stations in Great Britain opened in 1862
Railway stations in Great Britain closed in 1944
Railway stations in Great Britain opened in 1948
Railway stations in Great Britain closed in 1956
1862 establishments in Scotland